The Hereford Zone is an area in Northern Baltimore County, Maryland, United States, constituting 20% of all of the land in Baltimore County.  It includes Hereford, Parkton, Monkton, Freeland, Sparks, White Hall, Jacksonville, Upperco, and Glyndon.

It is by far the most sparsely populated area in Baltimore County. Strict zoning laws prohibit any planned communities from developing, with large single-family housing lots and agricultural activity predominating.

Because of its higher elevation and microclimate, the weather of The Hereford Zone is slightly different from that of the rest of the county.  It is not unusual in the winter for schools in the surrounding areas to be 2 hours late, while the Hereford Zone is closed due to inclement weather.

Near the most northern part of the zone in the topmost strip where Baltimore County meets south central Pennsylvania, numerous mini tornadoes and wind storms zip through the fields unfettered by buildings or natural land changes to halt their progress.  The air quality in the area is markedly different from that of the suburbs of Baltimore City to the south.  Both the land elevation as it climbs from sea level to 966' at the Mason-Dixon Line near Stiltz, Pa.,on Middletown Rd  and the absence of smokestack manufacturing combine with the prevailing westerly winds to eliminate the yellow haze associated with low levels of pollution on even the most humid summer days.

Hereford High School, Parkton has the only agriscience program in the county along with Hereford Middle School. The school's mascot is the Bull, and the women's teams are called the "Lady Bulls".

In the Hereford Zone, Prettyboy Reservoir covers an area of 206.5 sq/km behind the scenic Prettyboy Dam on the Gunpowder River.

The Hereford High School varsity football team (The "Bulls") is well known throughout the state of Maryland. The Bulls have won 3 state titles in 1997, 2001, and 2002. Much of this success is attributed to coach Steve Turnbaugh, who turned around a formerly downtrodden Hereford football program.

Hereford High is also the host of the annual "Bull Run" Cross Country Invitational, run in the end of September, which is one of the largest East Coast cross country running events, attracting over 100 schools from surrounding states. The "grueling" course is noted for its hills, twists, turns, and a steep ravine known as "The Dip", all making for what has been called "The Toughest Three Miles in Cross-Country" by John Dye of DyeStat.

Hereford Theatre has won numerous statewide awards through CAPPIES, including Best Musical 2005 for their production of Pippin. They received the award at the Hippodrome Theatre in Baltimore, MD.

The Hereford Ladies Faire and Chamber Choir are also known as one of the best award-winning choirs in the county, consistently receiving 1's in adjudications year after year.

References

Geography of Baltimore County, Maryland